Hydrostatic weighing, also referred to as underwater weighing, hydrostatic body composition analysis and hydrodensitometry, is a technique for measuring the density of a living person's body. It is a direct application of  Archimedes' principle, that an object displaces its own volume of water.

Method
The procedure is based on Archimedes' principle, which states that:
The buoyant force which water exerts on an immersed object is equal to the weight of water that the object displaces.

Example 1: If a block of solid stone weighs 3 kilograms on dry land and 2 kilogram when immersed in a tub of water, then it has displaced 1 kilogram of water.  Since 1 liter of water weighs 1 kilogram (at 4 °C), it follows that the volume of the block is 1 liter and the density (mass/volume) of the stone is 3 kilograms/liter.

Example 2:  Consider a larger block of the same stone material as in Example 1 but with a 1-liter cavity inside of the same amount of stone.  The block would still weigh 3 kilograms on dry land (ignoring the weight of air in the cavity) but it would now displace 2 liters of water so its immersed weight would be only 1 kilogram (at 4 °C).

In either of the examples above, the correct density can be calculated by the following equation:

Where:  Db = Density of the body, Ma = "Mass in air" (i.e. dry weight), Mw = "Mass in water" (i.e. underwater weight), Dw = Density of water (based on water temperature), RV = Residual volume (the unfilled space enclosed by the body- e.g. volume of air in the lungs + respiratory passages after a maximum exhalation).

The residual volume in the lungs can add error if not measured directly or estimated accurately. Residual volume can be measured by gas dilution procedures or estimated from a person's age and height:
 Inches:  RV-Est(Men) = 0.033 X Ht. (inches) + 0.022 X Age (yrs.) - 1.232
 Metric:  RV-Est(Men) = 1.310 X Ht. (meters) + 0.022 X Age (yrs.) - 1.232

 Inches:  RV-Est(Women) = 0.046 X Ht. (inches) + 0.016 X Age (yrs.) - 2.003
 Metric:  RV-Est(Women) = 1.812 X Ht. (meters) + 0.016 X Age (yrs.) - 2.003
               
Residual volume may also be estimated as a proportion of vital capacity (0.24 for men and 0.28 for women).

Application
Once body density has been calculated from the data obtained by hydrostatic/underwater weighing, body composition can be estimated.  The most commonly used equations for estimating the percent of body fat from density are those of Siri and Brozek et al.:

Siri (1956):  Fat %  = [4.950 /Density - 4.500]×100

Brozek et al. (1963):  Fat %  = [4.570 /Density - 4.142]×100

References

See also
Body composition
Composition of the human body
Body fat percentage

Anthropometry
Obesity
Classification of obesity